Andrew Heron Wilson (24 August 1844 – 29 August 1906) was a politician in colonial Queensland, and a member of the Queensland Legislative Council.

Early life 
Wilson was son of Andrew Wilson and Grace (Heron) his wife, was born at Ayr, Scotland, and educated at the Ayr Academy. He emigrated to Queensland in 1864, and became a large saw-mill owner at Maryborough, Queensland. He was married at Cunning Park, Ayr, to Miss Jessie Adam.

Politics 
Wilson was called to the Legislative Council in 1883 where he served until his death in 1906.

Published works

References

Further reading
 

1844 births
1906 deaths
Members of the Queensland Legislative Council
19th-century Australian politicians